Anna Seghers (born Anna Reiling, 19 November 1900 – 1 June 1983), is the pseudonym of a German writer notable for exploring and depicting the moral experience of the Second World War. Born into a Jewish family and married to a Hungarian Communist, Seghers escaped Nazi-controlled territory through wartime France. She was granted a visa and gained ship's passage to Mexico, where she lived in Mexico City (1941–47).

She returned to Europe after the war, living in West Berlin (1947–50), which was occupied by Allied forces. She eventually settled in the German Democratic Republic, where she worked on cultural and peace issues. She received numerous awards and in 1967 was nominated for the Nobel Prize by the GDR. She died and was buried in Berlin in 1983.

She is believed to have based her pseudonym, Anna Seghers, on the surname of the Dutch painter and printmaker Hercules Pieterszoon Seghers or Segers (c. 1589 – c. 1638).

Life 
Seghers was born Anna Reiling in Mainz in 1900 into a Jewish family. She was called "Netty". Her father, Isidor Reiling, was a dealer in antiques and cultural artefacts. In Cologne and Heidelberg she studied history, the history of art, and Chinese.

In 1925 she married László Radványi, also known as Johann Lorenz Schmidt, a Hungarian Communist and academic, thereby acquiring Hungarian citizenship.

She joined the Communist Party of Germany in 1928, at a time when the Weimar Republic was moribund and soon to be replaced. Her 1932 novel, Die Gefährten was a prophetic warning of the dangers of Nazism, for which she was arrested by the Gestapo. In 1932, she formally left the Jewish community.

By 1934 she had emigrated, via Zürich, to Paris. After German troops invaded the French Third Republic in 1940, she fled to Marseilles, seeking to leave Europe.

One year later, she was granted an entry visa to Mexico and ship's passage. Settling in Mexico City, she founded the anti-fascist 'Heinrich-Heine-Klub', named after the German Jewish poet Heinrich Heine. She also founded Freies Deutschland (Free Germany), an academic journal.

While still in Paris, in 1939, she had written The Seventh Cross. The novel is set in 1936 and describes the escape of seven prisoners from a concentration camp. It was published in English in the United States in 1942 and quickly adapted for an American movie of the same name. The Seventh Cross was one of the very few depictions of Nazi concentration camps, in either literature or the cinema, during World War II. In 1947 Seghers was awarded the Georg Büchner-Prize for this novel.

Seghers's best-known short story, the title of her collection in The Outing of the Dead Girls (1946), was written in Mexico. It was partially autobiographical, drawn from her reminiscence and reimagining of a pre-World War I class excursion on the Rhine river. She explores the actions of the protagonist's classmates in light of their decisions and ultimate fates during both world wars. In describing them, the German countryside, and her hometown Mainz, which was soon destroyed in the second war, Seghers expresses lost innocence and ponders the senseless injustices of war. She shows there is no escape from such loss, whether or not one sympathized with the NSDAP. Other notable Seghers novels include Sagen von Artemis (1938) and The Ship of the Argonauts (1953), both based on myths.

In 1947, Seghers returned to Germany, settling in West Berlin, an enclave within the Soviet-controlled East Germany. She joined the Socialist Unity Party of Germany in the zone occupied by the Soviets. That year she was also awarded the Georg Büchner Prize for her novel Transit, written in German, and published in English in 1944.

In 1950, she moved to East Berlin, where she co-founded the Academy of the Arts of the GDR, and became a member of the World Peace Council.

Her radio play The Trial of Joan of Arc at Rouen, 1431 was adapted to the stage by Bertolt Brecht. It was written in collaboration with Benno Besson and premiered at the Berliner Ensemble in November 1952, in a production directed by Besson (his first important production with the Ensemble), with Käthe Reichel as Joan.

Honors and awards
In 1951, Seghers received the first National Prize of the GDR and the Stalin Peace Prize. She received an honorary doctorate from the University of Jena in 1959. Seghers was nominated for the 1967 Nobel Prize in Literature by the German Academy of Arts. In 1981, she was made an honorary citizen of her native town Mainz. She died in Berlin on 1 June 1983 and is buried there.

Representation in other media
The Seventh Cross (1944) was adapted in English from her 1942 novel of the same name and released by MGM, starring Spencer Tracy.
Anna Seghers is mentioned in the German ostalgie film, Good Bye, Lenin! (2003), directed by Wolfgang Becker.
Her novel published as Transit (1944) in English, set in Marseilles, was adapted for a 2018 film of the same name by German director Christian Petzold. It was set in contemporary Marseilles, again a center of refugees.

Selected works 
Anna Seghers's earlier works are typically attributed to the New Objectivity movement. She also made a number of important contributions to Exilliteratur, including her novels Transit and The Seventh Cross. Her later novels, published in the GDR, are often associated with socialist realism. A number of her novels have been adapted into films in Germany.

 1928 – Aufstand der Fischer von St. Barbara – Revolt of the Fishermen of Santa Barbara (novel)
 1933 – Der Kopflohn – A Price on His Head (novel)
 1939 – Das siebte Kreuz – The Seventh Cross (novel)
 1943 – Der Ausflug der toten Mädchen – "The Excursion of the Dead Girls" (story) (in German Women Writers of the Twentieth Century, Pergamon Press, 1978)
 1944 - Transit – Transit (novel)
 1946 - Die Saboteure – The Saboteurs (1946)
 1949 - Die Toten bleiben jung – The Dead Stay Young (novel)
 1949 -  (short story) "The Wedding from Haiti"
 1950 - Die Linie.
 1950 - Der Kesselflicker "The Tinker" (short story)
 1951 - Crisanta (novella)
 1951 - Die Kinder.
 1952 - Der Mann und sein Name (novella)
 1953 - Der Bienenstock "The Beehive" (short story)
 1954 - Gedanken zur DDR. In Aufsätze ... 1980, as an excerpt from Andreas Lixl-Purcell (ed.): Erinnerungen deutsch-jüdischer Frauen 1900–1990.
 1958 - Brot und Salz "Bread and Salt" (short story)
 1959 - Die Entscheidung "The Decision" (novel)
 1961 - Das Licht auf dem Galgen "The Light on the Gallows" (short story)
 1963 - Über Tolstoi. Über Dostojewski.
 1965 - Die Kraft der Schwachen The Power of the Weak (novel)
 1967 - Das wirkliche Blau. Eine Geschichte aus Mexiko. "The Real Blue" (short story)
 1968 - Das Vertrauen Trust (novel)
 1969 - Glauben an Irdisches (essays)
 1970 - Briefe an Leser.
 1970 - Über Kunstwerk und Wirklichkeit.
 1971 - Überfahrt. Eine Liebesgeschichte. "Crossing: A Love Story" (Diálogos Books, 2016)
 1972 - Sonderbare Begegnungen Strange Encounters (short stories)
 1973 - Der proceß der Jeanne d'Arc zu Rouen 1431 The Trial of Joan of Arc in Rouen (radio play, later adapted by Berthold Brecht)
 1973 – Benito's Blue and Nine Other Stories
 1977 - Steinzeit. "Stone Age" Wiederbegegnung "Reencounter" (short stories)
 1980 - Drei Frauen aus Haiti Three Women from Haiti (short stories)
 1990 - Der gerechte Richter The Righteous Judge (short stories)

See also 
 Exilliteratur

Further reading 
Anna Seghers: Eine Biographie in Bildern, edited by Frank Wagner, Ursula Emmerich, Ruth Radvanyi; with an essay by Christa Wolf, Berlin: Aufbau, 2000
Helen Fehervary, Anna Seghers: The Mythic Dimension. Ann Arbor: University of Michigan Press, 2001.
Anna Seghers: The Challenge of History, edited by Helen Fehervary, Christiane Zehl Romero, Amy Kepple Strawser. Boston: Brill, 2020.
 Writers on the Left in an Age of Extremes: Edgell Rickword, Anna Seghers, Carlo Levo, by Greta Sykes and David Morgan. London: Socialist History Society, 2021.

References

External links 

 
 Information on the translated novels by John Manson
 Die-Anna-Seghers-Home-Page 
 German biography (Potsdam University)
 Biography by Prof. Ian Wallace, (in German)
Interview with Anna Seghers' children 
Foreword to a biography on Anna Seghers, University of Michigan Press
"Anna Seghers", Jewish Women's Archive
Anna Seghers' literary memorial in Berlin
"Radfahrer, dein Verhalten", a digitized Tarnschriften with excerpts by Anna Seghers at the Leo Baeck Institute, New York 

1900 births
1983 deaths
20th-century German novelists
20th-century German women writers
People from Rhenish Hesse
Writers from Mainz
Writers from Rhineland-Palatinate
Communist Party of Germany members
Cultural Association of the GDR members
Heidelberg University alumni
Socialist Unity Party of Germany members
University of Cologne alumni
Georg Büchner Prize winners
Kleist Prize winners
Stalin Peace Prize recipients
Recipients of the National Prize of East Germany
Recipients of the Order of Friendship of Peoples
Recipients of the Order of the Red Banner of Labour
Recipients of the Patriotic Order of Merit in gold
Recipients of the Patriotic Order of Merit in silver
Communist women writers
Exilliteratur writers
East German writers
East German women
German emigrants to France
German emigrants to Mexico
German women novelists
Jewish emigrants from Nazi Germany to France
Jewish novelists
Jewish women writers